Alexander Franken (born 1 April 1916, date of death unknown) was a Dutch water polo player who competed in the 1936 Summer Olympics. Born in Utrecht, he was part of the Dutch team which finished fifth in the 1936 tournament. He played all seven matches.

References

1916 births
Year of death missing
Dutch male water polo players
Olympic water polo players of the Netherlands
Sportspeople from Utrecht (city)
Water polo players at the 1936 Summer Olympics
20th-century Dutch people